The Curaçao national under-20 football team is the official football team under 20 of Curaçao, under the control of the Curaçao Football Federation.

List of Coaches
  Hans Schrijver (2013–Present)

Current squad
 The following players were called up for the 2022 CONCACAF U-20 Championship.
 Match dates: 18 June – 3 July 2022
 Caps and goals correct as of:' 25 June 2022
 Names in italics denote players who have been capped for the senior team.''

References

 Curaçao Under 20, soccerway.com

External links
 Federashon Futbol Korsou; Official website
 Curaçao at the FIFA website.

under-20
Caribbean national under-20 association football teams